Events from the year 1632 in England.

Incumbents
 Monarch – Charles I
 Lord Chancellor – Thomas Coventry, 1st Baron Coventry

Events
 29 March –  The Treaty of Saint-Germain-en-Laye is signed in which England agrees to return all of New France to French control
 15 June – Sir Francis Windebank is made chief Secretary of State.
 20 June – A royal charter issued for the foundation of Maryland colony in North America.  Lord Baltimore appointed as the first governor.
 July – portraitist Anthony van Dyck, newly returned to London, is knighted and granted a pension as principalle Paynter in ordinary to their majesties.
 17 October – the court of Star Chamber prohibits all "news books" because of complaints from Spanish and Austrian diplomats that coverage in England of the Thirty Years' War is unfair.

Literature
 The Second Folio of William Shakespeare's plays published.
 Publication of William Prynne's Histriomastix, an attack on the English Renaissance theatre.

Births
 13 March – John Houblon, first Governor of the Bank of England (died 1712)
 29 August – John Locke, philosopher (died 1704)
 20 October – Christopher Wren, architect, astronomer and mathematician (died 1723)
 17 December – Anthony Wood, antiquarian (died 1695)

Deaths
 26 March – Sir John Leman, merchant, landowner, Lord Mayor of London and benefactor (born 1544)
 22 June – James Whitelocke, judge (born 1570)
 23 August – Frances Carr, Countess of Somerset, noblewoman complicit in murder (born 1590)
 25 August – Thomas Dekker, dramatist (born c. 1572)
 5 November – Henry Percy, 9th Earl of Northumberland, nobleman, Catholic sympathiser and scientist (born 1564)
 27 November – John Eliot, statesman (born 1592)

 
Years of the 17th century in England